Robert Diligent (16 June 1924 – 3 January 2014) was a French journalist.

Born in Roubaix, he began his career in journalism in 1959 and was best known for being one of the founding members of Télé Luxembourg. He retired in 1993.

Robert Diligent died on 3 January 2014, aged 89, in Nice.

References

1924 births
2014 deaths
People from Roubaix
French journalists
French male non-fiction writers